Nathalie Lamborelle (born 1 February 1988) is a road cyclist from Luxembourg. She participated at the 2007, 2010 and 2011 UCI Road World Championships.

References

External links
 profile at Procyclingstats.com

1988 births
Luxembourgian female cyclists
Living people
Place of birth missing (living people)